Jeannie is a feminine name and a petform of Jeanne, a variant form of Jechonan (יוחנן). It is ultimately originated from the Hebrew masculine name (יְהוֹחָנָן) Jehohanan or (יוֹחָנָן) Yohanan meaning 'God is gracious' or 'The Lord gives mercy'. Jeannie may be a nickname of Jeannette. Jeannie means 'God is gracious'. It is considered a great and lucky name for a baby girl in different cultures. It may also be used as the feminine version of John or Jimmy. The name Jeannie is famous in the NBC TV show I Dream of Jeannie.

Women with the given name include:
 Jeannie Baker (born 1950), English author and illustrator of children's picture books
 Jeannie Berlin (born 1949), American actress and screenwriter
 Jeannie Blaylock, American television journalist and news anchor
 Jeannie Bueller, Fictional character in 80s cult classic 'Ferris Bueller's day off' played by actress Jennifer Grey.
 Jeannie Carson (born 1928), English-born retired comedian and actress
 Jeannie Chan (born 1989), Hong Kong actress and model
 Jeannie Darneille (born 1949), American politician
 Jeannie A. Davidson, (born 1955, American - Ms. America, Ms. Olympia Bodybuilding
 Jeannie Drake, Baroness Drake (born 1948), British trade unionist
 Jeannie Epper (born 1941), American stuntperson and actress
 Jeannie Gunn (1870-1961), Australian novelist and teacher
 Jeannie Haddaway (born 1977), American politician
 Jeannie Leavitt (born c. 1967), United States Air Force officer, first female Air Force fighter pilot, and first woman to command an Air Force combat fighter wing
 Jeannie Cho Lee, Hong Kong-based, Korean-American wine critic, author, journalist, consultant, wine educator and Master of Wine
 Jeannie Longo (born 1958), French racing cyclist
 Jeannie Mah (born 1952), Canadian ceramic artist
 Jeannie Mai (born 1979), American fashion expert and television personality
 Jeannie Marie-Jewell (born 1961), Canadian politician
 Jeannie McDaniel, American politician elected to the Oklahoma House of Representatives in 2004
 Jeannie Ortega (born 1986), American Christian singer, songwriter, dancer and actress
 Jeannie Pepper (born 1958), American pornographic actress
 Jeannie C. Riley (born 1945), American country music and gospel singer
 Jeannie Robertson (1908-1975), Scottish folk singer
 Jeannie Seely (born 1940), American country music singer
 Jeannie Suk (born 1973), Harvard Law School professor
 Jeannie Tirado, American voice actress
 Jeannie Ugyuk, Canadian politician elected to the Legislative Assembly of Nunavut in 2010

Fictional characters with the name include:
 Jeannie Hopkirk, a character in the British paranormal television series Randall and Hopkirk (deceased)

See also
 Jeanie
 Jeanny
 Jenny

Given names
English feminine given names
Scottish feminine given names
French feminine given names